Bushdale, a former small German community, is now a ghost town in Milam County, Texas, 3 miles north of Rockdale. The town never grew much during its "primetime", as Bushdale only contained a one-teacher school and a few businesses. The school was consolidated with Rockdale in 1949. Today, only the cemetery remains.

References

German-American culture in Texas
Ghost towns in Milam County, Texas
Ghost towns in Central Texas